XHRPL-FM 93.9 is a radio station in León, Guanajuato. It is owned by Radio Promotora Leonesa and is known as La Poderosa.

History
XEKX-AM received its first concession on March 20, 1953, owned by León Radio, S.A. In the 1960s, XEKX became XERPL-AM, and the concession later changed to reflect the full name of its owner, Radio Promotora Leonesa.

In 1994, XERPL became an AM-FM combo. The AM frequency was surrendered on November 10, 2020.

References

Radio stations in Guanajuato
Radio stations established in 1953
1953 establishments in Mexico